Libellago adami (Adam's gem) is a species of damselfly in the family Chlorocyphidae. It is endemic to Sri Lanka.  Its natural habitats are streams and lowland wet zone rivers, where there is fast flowing waters exist. It is threatened by habitat loss.

Sources 

 http://animaldiversity.org/accounts/Libellago_adami/classification/
 http://slendemics.net/easl/invertibrates/Dragonflyies/dragonflies.html
 https://web.archive.org/web/20150219172210/http://www.wht.lk/storage/book_downloads/CorrigendaAddendum.pdf
 http://onlinelibrary.wiley.com/doi/10.1111/j.1365-3113.1939.tb00488.x/abstract;jsessionid=84595BA5BC46096A673EAB51CC35F861.f03t04
 http://www.wildreach.com/reptile/animals/dragonflies.php

Endemic fauna of Sri Lanka
Insects of Sri Lanka
Insects described in 1939